Sirved Mobile Solutions Inc. is a Canadian technology company founded in 2015 in Windsor, Ontario. It uses various technologies to collect and index restaurant menus and information.

History 
Sirved was founded in 2015 by Jonathan Leslie and Kyle Brown. The company was originally designed to be an online food ordering service, similar to Just Eat and GrubHub. However, in 2018 the company re-focused its efforts into making itself a "restaurant discovery platform" expanding on their searching and discovery features.

Growth and Expansion 
After their initial launch in 2015, Sirved began building a database of restaurant menus - starting in Windsor, Ontario. They expanded into more regions, eventually including menus from the rest of Canada and the United States. Their menu database now hosts menus for over 400,000 restaurants.

During their expansion into the US market, Sirved was featured in the Start-Up Alley at the 2018 National Restaurant Association show at McCormick Place in Chicago.

Technology 
Sirved uses various technologies to analyze restaurant menus. Through this process they use artificial intelligence algorithms and other techniques to index restaurant menus, allowing users to find specific food items on particular menus through a menu-driven search engine.

Rebranding 
When Sirved first launched, the branding consisted of a red logo featuring a crossed fork and knife.

In 2019 the company decided to rebrand following the 2018 pivot from online ordering to "restaurant discovery". Sirved rebranded with a new logo featuring a multi-tool with a fork and spoon, and switched their company colour to purple. This rebranding came alongside a redesigned version of their website, IOS and Android mobile apps.

Community Outreach 
Sirved has partnered with the Canadian Mental Health Association as part of the Sole Focus Project. As part of the partnership, users of the service could purchase fan event tickets to a Detroit Tigers baseball game, which included a donation to the Canadian Mental Health Association and the Sole Focus Project.

Sirved has partnered with Windsors Carrousel of Nations event, acting as a companion app for the event. The app was used to showcase the menus for each of the food villages and the events that took place. This allowed each of the event locations to have their location and menu made accessible on the internet.

References 

Technology companies of Canada
Restaurants in Canada